The Hotlum Glacier is a glacier situated on the northeast flank of Mount Shasta, in the US state of California. It is the largest and most voluminous glacier in California, although not as thick or long as the nearby Whitney Glacier. It flows northeastward down the steep slope, forming three lobes which terminate near .

In 2002, scientists made the first detailed survey of Mount Shasta's glaciers in 50 years. They found that seven of the glaciers have grown over the period 1951–2002, with the Hotlum and Wintun Glaciers nearly doubling, the Bolam Glacier increasing by half, and the Whitney and Konwakiton Glaciers growing by a third.

See also
List of glaciers in the United States

References

Bill Guyton (2001). Glaciers of California: Modern Glaciers, Ice Age Glaciers, the Origin of the Yosemite Valley, and a Glacier Tour in the Sierra Nevada. University of California Press. .

Glaciers of Siskiyou County, California
Glaciers of California
Glaciers of Mount Shasta